The Aringa are a Central Sudanic ethnic group in the northwestern corner of Uganda. The majority live in the rural areas of Yumbe District just south of the Sudanese border, and to a lesser extent in other areas of the West Nile sub-region. They are considered the indigenous people of their lands, which was later settled by so-called "Nubians". They speak Aringa language, a Central Sudanic language.

Aringa, like the neighboring Kakwa people, were blamed by other groups in Uganda for doing Idi Amin's "dirty work" in the 1970s. Amin was a Kakwa and his vice president, Mustafa Adrisi, an Aringa. After the Uganda-Tanzania War and the demise of Amin's regime in 1979, Aringa were persecuted by the joint Uganda National Liberation Army (UNLA) and Tanzania People's Defence Force. This caused them to scatter, some to the Democratic Republic of the Congo, some to Sudan, and the rest throughout Uganda. Until they began drifting back to their villages eight or ten years later, Aringa county was almost completely depopulated.

When the Tanzanian occupying forces were replaced by the UNLA in 1980, the UNLA engaged in brutal reprisals against the local civilian population, who were considered supporters of ex-Amin forces. In late 1980, guerrillas consisting of former Amin forces invaded from southern Sudan and forced some UNLA units out of the West Nile region. They included the Uganda National Rescue Front, based principally among the Aringa people, and the Former Uganda National Army, based mainly among the Kakwa. This led the UNLA to engage in further reprisals, large-scale destruction of property, and massacres in both Arua and Moyo District, leading as many as 500,000 West Nile civilians, including Aringa, to flee to Sudan. Many remained in refugee camps in Sudan until the late 1980s when the National Resistance Army took power in Uganda. In 1987, Sudan People's Liberation Army rebels attacked and burned the camps, forcing the refugees to flee back to Uganda.

References

Ethnic groups in Uganda